Fukuro-machi is a Hiroden station (tram stop) on the Hiroden Ujina Line located in Ote-machi 2-chome, Naka-ku, Hiroshima.

Connections
█ Ujina Line
  
Hondori — Fukuro-machi — Chuden-mae

Around station
Hiroshima Peace Memorial Park
Hiroshima Hondori Syoutengai
Municipal Fukuromachi Elementary School in Hiroshima
Fukuromachi Elementary School Peace Museum
The Former Bank of Japan Hiroshima Branch
NHK Hiroshima
Hiroshima ANA Hotel
Hiroshima TV

History
Opened on November 23, 1912.
Closed from 1942 to 1945.

See also
Hiroden Streetcar Lines and Routes

References

Fukuro-machi Station
Railway stations in Japan opened in 1912